Dutch intervention in Bali may refer to:
 Dutch intervention in Northern Bali (1846)
 Dutch intervention in Northern Bali (1848)
 Dutch intervention in Bali (1849)
 Dutch intervention in Bali (1858)
 Dutch intervention in Bali (1906)
 Dutch intervention in Bali (1908)

See also 
 Dutch intervention in Lombok and Karangasem, 1894